Khövsgöl may refer to several locations in Mongolia:

Lake Khövsgöl
Khövsgöl Province
Khövsgöl sum, in Dornogovi Province